Galina Shikhova (born 11 December 1940) is a Soviet alpine skier. She competed in three events at the 1972 Winter Olympics.

References

External links
 

1940 births
Living people
Soviet female alpine skiers
Olympic alpine skiers of the Soviet Union
Alpine skiers at the 1972 Winter Olympics
Skiers from Moscow